Sher Ali may refer to:

 Sher Ali Khan (1825–1879), Amir of Afghanistan
 Sher Ali Bacha (1935–1998), Pashtun revolutionary leader
 Sher Ali Afridi (died 1873), the Pashtun prisoner who killed the British Viceroy of India
 Maulvi Sher Ali (1875–1947), Ahmadi Muslim scholar and Quran translator
 Sher Ali Khan Pataudi (1913–2002), Pakistan Army general
 Sher Ali (sepoy), soldier of the Indian Army decorated for heroism in action in 1945, see Non-U.S. recipients of U.S. gallantry awards
 Sher Ali (cricketer) (born 1970), Pakistani cricketer

See also
 Ali Sher (disambiguation)
 Haider Ali (disambiguation)